= Old Downtown of Zemun =

- Interactive map of the Old Downtown of Zemun area

General information
- Location: Zemun, Belgrade, Serbia
- Construction started: XVIII
- Construction stopped: XIX

Height
- Tip: Old downtown

Website
- http://beogradskonasledje.rs/

The Downtown of Zemun is the name of the historical part of Zemun, located in its central part. Represents ensembles of great importance, and the backbone of the cultural and social development of Zemun.

== History ==
Since 1717, the army of Eugene of Savoy entered Zemun, which then became part of the Austrian Empire, in whose composition it developed until 1918. Its continued growth and development into a major urban environment can be traced through several stages limited by certain political events. In the first half of the 18th century, in the reconstruction phase, the former village of oriental character with a predominantly Christian population, Zemun re-inhabited and developed in a very subordinate position in relation to Belgrade. This phase was limited by Požarevac and Belgrade Peace. In the second phase, in the second half of the 18th century, gradually growing and forming the core. This phase ends in the Austro-Turkish and the Napoleonic Wars in the late 18th and early 19th century. . In the third phase, during the 19th and early 20th centuries, Zemun developed within the framework set by changing the construction or reconstruction fund inherited condition of the First Serbian Uprising to the First World War. The fourth phase, of the First World War up to date, characterize single development in old core of Zemun, who ceases to be a discrete place.

== Urban development ==
The existing urban agglomeration and architectural construction funds in the Old Downtown of Zemun are themselves sources for the particular study and research on the development of methods of organizing and formation of the settlement, the construction of the buildings, the use of construction materials, municipal development, shaping the building, functional and content-feature architecture and spatial organization in general life. Architectural heritage which we mean the total physical fund of spatial embodiments, the source and for the study of differentiation and social infrastructure certain period of growth, social possibilities, regional, ethnic and religious specificity, the taste of the epoch, and many other forms of life. That study could be carried out by analyzing the material remains or ensembles created and saved most of the early 18th century to today. In original condition, many buildings are fully preserved especially in the second half of the 19th century, while a smaller number of houses from the earliest period, from the time of the first decades of the 18th century, when the Zemun became part of the Austrian Empire, preserved in its original conditions and shape only partially. Chronology of the formation can also be partly determined by analyzes of structures, based on existing records on them, the material used and the way of construction, type and style analysis. Oral traditions of residents whose families from one generation to another inhabit the existing buildings, preserved items and inventory in houses, expanding the sources of the researches. Generally, the old downtown of Zemun is a basic source particularly for architectural and artistic-historical research methods.
